Soma Mukhopādhyāy is an Indian educator and the creator of the scientifically unproven rapid prompting method (RPM), which is closely related to facilitated communication. Her use of the RPM with her autistic son Tito (born 1989) garnered media attention in America in the late 1990s and early 2000s.

Mukhopadhyay came to the United States in 2001, and joined Helping Autism through Learning and Outreach (HALO) in Texas in 2005.  She also hosts workshops involving RPM worldwide.  RPM was featured in an Apple Inc. commercial, which led to further controversy over her technique.

It has been noted that Mukhopadhyay gives a high rate of verbal, gestural, and physical prompts even to the most independent students, and uses circular logic to explain why she claims RPM is legitimate. Mukhopadhyay has also acknowledged that a teacher who wants to move quickly could accidentally guide the student's arm through touch, when that is not allowed in RPM.

References

External links
 

Living people
Year of birth missing (living people)
Indian women educators
People in alternative medicine
Educators from Texas